Achille Njanke (born 11 January 1984 in Yaoundé) is a Cameroonian footballer. He plays for FC Grenchen in Switzerland.

Njanke followed FC Baulmes relegated to 1. Liga in summer 2007. But after played 2 games and scored two goals, he joined Yverdon-Sport on 15 January 2008. He signed for current club FC Grenchen on 1 February 2009.

External links

Profile on football.ch  

1984 births
Living people
Cameroonian footballers
Cameroonian expatriate footballers
Association football forwards
Footballers from Yaoundé
FC Lugano players
Yverdon-Sport FC players
Expatriate footballers in Switzerland